Puerto Ayora is a town in central Galápagos, Ecuador. Located on the southern shore of Santa Cruz Island, it is the seat of Santa Cruz Canton.  The town is named in honor of Isidro Ayora, an Ecuadorian president. The town is sometimes mistakenly referred to as Santa Cruz. Puerto Ayora is the most populous town in the Galápagos Islands, with more than 12,000 inhabitants.

Climate
Puerto Ayora has a protected location, along the shores of Academy Bay, where a refreshing breeze often provides pleasant weather. Temperatures vary between 18 and 29 °C (64 and 82 °F).  The hot season usually runs from December to May.

Infrastructure
Puerto Ayora has the best developed infrastructure in the archipelago. The larger of the two Galápagos banks, Banco del Pacifico, is located in Puerto Ayora. The walkable downtown area of Puerto Ayora is a small strip of hotels, restaurants, tour companies, gift shops, clothing stores, marine stores, tourist shops and night clubs. The main Avenue is named Avenida Charles Darwin and begins on the main dock of Puerto Ayora and finishes at the Charles Darwin Research Station. The Town Hall (Alcaldía) is on Avenida Charles Darwin as well. Puerto Ayora is the best place in Galápagos for communicating with the outside world via numerous cybercafes with Internet access or telephone offices.

Puerto Ayora emergency medical facilities include a new hospital opened in 2006 and the island's only hyperbaric chamber. There is a Health Center (Centro de Salud) in the northern part of Puerto Ayora as well.

Most of the locals live in the northern part of the town where various schools, a market hall and a sports center were built. Most of the shops, hardware stores and grocery stores there can be found in Calle Baltra and Calle Durán. The stadium is in the northwest of the center close to the bus station.
Fresh water is at a premium on the island and in this town. Locals practice water conservation and typically collect rainwater during the rainy season.  There is a desalination plant on the island. Many facilities have separate water systems with varying degrees of use/quality. For example, water used for cleaning/showering may not be drinkable.

Sights
Home to both the Charles Darwin Foundation and the Galápagos National Park, Puerto Ayora is the center of the Galápagos conservation efforts.  Island visitors may visit the Charles Darwin Research Station to learn the history of the islands and future conservation plans.
Iglesia de San Francisco is a modern church which was built in 1968. Iglesia de Edén and Iglesia de la Calle E are modern churches in the northern part of Puerto Ayora with colourful wall paintings which are worth a visit as well.

Excursions
Tortuga Bay is a short walk from center of Puerto Ayora where you can view marine iguanas, birds, galapagos crabs and a natural mangrove where you can spot white tip reef sharks and the gigantic galápagos tortoise.

The Itabaca Channel is located between two islands in the Galápagos, Baltra Island, also known as South Seymour Island, and Santa Cruz Island.  The Itabaca Channel is used by water taxis who take people from Baltra to Santa Cruz.

Academy Bay is a busy harbor, normally full of boats cruising the islands, passing private yachts and local fishing boats.  This bay is a good location to spot brown pelicans, golden rays, marine iguanas, herons, lava gulls, frigate birds, Galápagos sea lions, and large numbers of blue-footed boobies, which fish by spectacular plunge diving. North Seymour Island is an hour away by boat and has a wide array of animals with no people living on the island.

Transportation

Flights from continental Ecuador fly into either San Cristobal or to Baltra Island just off the north end of Santa Cruz.  Those airlines are AeroGal and LAN Ecuador. The typical means to reach Puerto Ayora from the Baltra airport is a bus ride to the  Itabaca Channel where a ferry ride is taken to Santa Cruz Island. Then another bus, courtesy vehicle or taxi is taken to Puerto Ayora. From the Puerto Ayora docks water taxis wait to take passengers to their boats or to west Puerto Ayora. The municipal bus station (Terminal) is in the northwest of the town.

There are also daily speed boats which take passengers to or from Puerto Ayora and the other inhabited islands of San Cristóbal or Isabela.

References

External links

Staying on Santa Cruz galapagosonline.com*

Populated places in Galápagos Province
Galápagos Islands